The 1983 South Australian Open was a men's professional tennis tournament held in Adelaide, Australia. The event was part of the 1983 Grand Prix circuit and was played on outdoor grass courts. It was the seventh edition of the tournament and was held from 29 December to 2 January 1984. Fifth-seeded Mike Bauer won the singles title.

Finals

Singles

 Mike Bauer defeated  Miloslav Mečíř 3–6, 6–4, 6–1
 It was Bauer's 3rd title of the year, and the 8th of his career.

Doubles

 Craig A. Miller /  Eric Sherbeck defeated  Broderick Dyke /  Rod Frawley 6–3, 4–6, 6–4
 It was Miller's 2nd title of the year and the 2nd of his career. It was Sherbeck's only title of the year and the 1st of his career.

References

External links
 ITF – tournament edition details

 

 
South Australian Open
South Australian Open
South Australian Open, 1983
South Australian Open
South Australian Open